Germany is a federal parliamentary republic in central-western Europe. Germany has the world's 4th largest economy by nominal GDP, and the 5th largest by PPP. As a global leader in several industrial and technological sectors, it is both the world's third-largest exporter and importer of goods.

Of the world's 500 largest stock-market-listed companies measured by revenue in 2017, the Fortune Global 500, 29 are headquartered in Germany. 30 Germany-based companies are included in the DAX, the German stock market index. Well-known international brands include Mercedes-Benz, BMW, SAP, Volkswagen, Audi, Siemens, Allianz, Adidas, Porsche, Deutsche Bahn, Deutsche Bank and Bosch.

Germany is recognised for its large portion of specialised small and medium enterprises, known as the Mittelstand model. Around 1,000 of these companies are global market leaders in their segment and are labelled hidden champions.

For further information on the types of business entities in this country and their abbreviations, see "Business entities in Germany".

Largest firms 

This list shows firms in the Fortune Global 500, which ranks firms by total revenues reported before 31 March 2018. Only the top five firms (if available) are included as a sample.

Notable firms 
This list includes notable companies with primary headquarters located in the country. The industry and sector follow the Industry Classification Benchmark taxonomy. Organizations which have ceased operations are included and noted as defunct.

See also 
 :Category:Companies of Germany
List of largest German companies
 List of German companies by employees in 1907
 List of German companies by employees in 1938

References 

Germany
!